Acacia preissiana is a shrub of the genus Acacia and the subgenus Pulchellae that is endemic to an area of south western Australia.

Description
It blooms from November to January and produces yellow flowers.

Etymology 
A. preissiana was first described as Acacia obscura var. preissiana by Carl Meissner in 1842, but in 1975 Bruce Maslin elevated it to species rank, naming it Acacia preissiana.

Distribution
It is native to an area in the South West, Peel and Great Southern regions of Western Australia where it is commonly found growing in lateritic based soils. The range of the plant extends from north of Binddon in the north down to the Whicher Range in the south. A single collection of the species has been made from around Albany where it is usually a part of Eucalyptus marginata or Eucalyptus wandoo forest communities.

See also
 List of Acacia species

References

preissiana
Acacias of Western Australia
Taxa named by Bruce Maslin
Taxa named by Carl Meissner
Plants described in 1842